Rohan Vir Luthra (born 6 May 2002) is an English professional footballer who plays as a goalkeeper for Cardiff City.

Career
Luthra joined the youth academy of Crystal Palace in 2010, and debuted with their U18s at the age of 15. On 2 June 2020, he signed his first professional contract with Crystal Palace. On 20 October 2020, he joined non-league club South Park on loan. On 22 June 2021, he moved to the youth academy of Cardiff City. On May June 2022, he extended the contract with Cardiff City. On 11 March 2023, he made his professional debut with Cardiff City as a late substitute in a 2–0 EFL Championship loss to Preston North End.

International career
Born in England, Luthra is of Punjabi Indian descent. He was called up to represent the England U15s.

Personal life
Outside of football, Luthra played cricket with the Sunbury Cricket Club since the age of 6. Starting as a wicket-keeper, he developed into an aggressive left-handed batsman. He left the club to focus on football after he was offered a scholarship by Crystal Palace.

References

External links
 

2002 births
Living people
English footballers
English people of Indian descent
Crystal Palace F.C. players
South Park F.C. players
Cardiff City F.C. players
Association football wingers
English Football League players
National League (English football) players